Savkovo is a rural locality (a village) in Malyshevskoye Rural Settlement, Selivanovsky District, Vladimir Oblast, Russia. The population was 23 as of 2010.

Geography 
Savkovo is located 40 km southwest of Krasnaya Gorbatka (the district's administrative centre) by road. Zakharovo is the nearest rural locality.

References 

Rural localities in Selivanovsky District